Opodepe Municipality is a municipality in Sonora in north-western Mexico.

Seat is Opodepe.

The municipal area is 2,804.25 km2 with a population of 2,842 registered in 2000.

Borders
Neighboring municipalities are Benjamín Hill Municipality,  Santa Ana Municipality, Cucurpe Municipality, Arizpe Municipality, Banámichi Municipality,  San Felipe de Jesús Municipality,  Carbó Municipality, Rayón Municipality and Trincheras Municipality.

References

Municipalities of Sonora